The play-off first legs were played on 9–11 November 2001, while the second legs were played on 13–14 November 2005. Winners of play-off round qualified to the championship played following year in May, where Switzerland was chosen to host the fixtures.

Matches

|}

First leg

Second leg

1–1 on aggregate, Czech Republic won on away goals rule.

Greece won 4–2 on aggregate

Belgium won 4–3 on aggregate

England won 3–2 on aggregate

2–2 on aggregate, Portugal won on away goals rule.

France won 5–0 on aggregate

Switzerland won 4–2 on aggregate

Italy won 5–2 on aggregate

External links
 Play-offs at UEFA.com

Play-offs
Play
2002